Refried Ectoplasm (Switched On Volume 2), released in July 1995, is a compilation by Stereolab of singles and rarities.

Reception

Along with Aluminum Tunes, the Rolling Stone Album Guide referred to  Refried Ectoplasm as being like "many odds-and-ends collections, are essential listening only for obsessives and completeists." and that the compilations "offer some of Stereolab's most experimental material, and occasionally-as with Refried's early singles ("Lo Boob Oscillator")-some of the group's more accessible tracks as well." Stephen Thomas Erlewine of AllMusic gave the album a 4.5 out of five rating, stating that the album is "far more than a mere oddities collection. More than any other album, Refried Ectoplasm charts Stereolab's astonishing musical growth between those three years, and offers several definitive songs -- including "Lo Boob Oscillator," "French Disko," and "John Cage Bubblegum".

Track listing

References

1995 compilation albums
Stereolab compilation albums
Drag City (record label) compilation albums
Flying Nun Records compilation albums
Flying Nun Records albums